College Le Cocq d'Armandville is a private Catholic secondary school, located in Nabire, Central Papua, Indonesia. The co-educational school was founded by the Indonesian Province of the Society of Jesus in 1987. The school is the only Jesuit college in Indonesia outside the island of Java.

Asked by the Diocese of Jayapura in 2000 to manage Adhi Luhur High School, also founded in 1987, the Jesuits commenced management of this school.

See also

 Catholic Church in Indonesia
 Education in Indonesia
 List of Jesuit schools

References  

Jesuit secondary schools in Indonesia
Educational institutions established in 1987
1987 establishments in Indonesia
Education in Central Papua
Schools in Western New Guinea